A car shuttle train, or (sometimes) car-carrying train, is a shuttle train used to transport accompanied cars (automobiles), and usually also other types of road vehicles, for a relatively short distance.

Car shuttle trains usually operate on lines passing through a rail tunnel and connecting two places not easily accessible to each other by road.  On car shuttle train services, the occupants of the road vehicles being carried on the train usually stay with their vehicle throughout the rail journey.

As such, car shuttle train services are to be contrasted with Auto Train or Motorail services.  Unlike a car shuttle train, an Auto Train or Motorail train is a passenger train on which, except in France, passengers can take their car or automobile along with them. On Auto Trains or Motorail trains, passengers are carried in normal passenger cars or in sleeping cars on longer journeys, while the cars or automobiles are loaded separately into autoracks, car carriers, or flatcars that normally form part of the same train.

By country

Austria

Böckstein, Salzburg – Mallnitz-Obervellach, Carinthia: Autoschleuse Tauern Railway Tunnel operated by the Austrian Federal Railways (ÖBB)

Between France and the United Kingdom

Accompanied road vehicles are carried in closed railway wagons through the Channel Tunnel between Sangatte (Pas-de-Calais, France) and Cheriton (Kent, United Kingdom). The car shuttle train is unique in that it is fully enclosed, and allows for double decker buses to travel in the same wagons as other regular passenger vehicles. Trucks going on the train travel in separate wagons that resemble cage-like frames, however.

Germany
The SyltShuttle operated by DB Fernverkehr and Autozug Sylt operated by Railroad Development Corporation transports road vehicles on railway wagons over the Hindenburgdamm from Niebüll, Schleswig-Holstein to Westerland in Sylt (or in the opposite direction).

Slovakia
ZSSK offers car shuttles trains (autovlak/motorail) from Humenné, Košice, Poprad to Prague and Bratislava.

Slovenia 
Car shuttle trains operate on the Bohinj Railway between Bohinjska Bistrica and Most na Soči through the Bohinj Tunnel to Podbrdo.

Switzerland

The following car shuttle trains operate in Switzerland (mostly through tunnels): 

 Andermatt (UR) - Sedrun (GR): Oberalp (only during winter while the road is closed) (MGB)
 Brig (VS) - Iselle di Trasquera (Italy): Simplon (BLS)
 Kandersteg (BE) - Goppenstein (VS): Lötschberg (no road connection) (BLS)
 Kandersteg (BE) - Iselle di Trasquera (Italy): Lötschberg and Simplon (BLS)
 Oberwald (VS) - Realp (UR): Furka Base Tunnel (MGB)
 Klosters Selfranga (GR) - Sagliains (GR): Vereina Tunnel (instead of the drive over the Flüelapass) (RhB)
 until 2011 Thusis (GR) - Samedan (GR): Albula Railway, including the Albula Tunnel (as an alternative to the Julierpass) (RhB)

Until the opening of the Gotthard Road Tunnel in 1980, there was also a car shuttle train through the Gotthard Rail Tunnel between Göschenen and Airolo. Following the catastrophic fire in the road tunnel on 24 October 2001, this car shuttle train resumed operations for a few weeks.

United Kingdom
The Great Western Railway introduced a car shuttle service in 1924 to transport cars and their passengers through the Severn Tunnel between Pilning and Severn Tunnel Junction, which operated from 1926 until 1966. The service survived until it was made redundant by the Severn Bridge in 1966. Motorail also operated on several British Rail routes from 1955 to 2005.

United States
From the 1960s to 2000, the town of Whittier, Alaska could be reached by vehicle by way of a train shuttle through the Whittier tunnel. In 2000, the expanded Anton Anderson Memorial Tunnel opened to shared vehicular and rail traffic.

See also

 Accompanied combined transport

 Intermodal passenger transport
 Lorry-Rail S.A.
 Modalohr
 Motorail
 Rail transport
 Road transport
 Rolling highway

References

External links 

 Urban commuter concept: increased range for electric vehicles by using trains
 BLS Lötschberg Car Transport 
 DB Autozug SyltShuttle 
 Eurotunnel 
 ÖBB Autoschleuse Tauernbahn 
 RhB Car transporter - Albula / Vereina 
 SBB Autoverlad Brig – Iselle 
 TransportGator

Road transport
Intermodal transport